Lebombo may refer to:

 Lebombo bone, an ancient tally stick
 Lebombo flat lizard
 Lebombo Mountains, Southern Africa
 Lebombo monocline, a geological feature of these mountains; see Explora Escarpment
 Androstachys johnsonii, also known as Lebombo ironwood
 Diocese of Lebombo

See also